The 2002–03 League of Ireland Premier Division was the 18th season of the League of Ireland Premier Division. The division was made up of 10 teams. Bohemians were declared champions.

Regular season
The 2003 season would see the League of Ireland Premier Division change from a winter league to a summer league. To facilitate this change, the 2002–03 season was a shortened season. This saw each team play three rounds of games, totalling 27 games each.

Final table

Results

Matches 1–18

Matches 19–27

Promotion/relegation play-off
The promotion/relegation play-off format was changed this season. It now featured four teams, the second, third and fourth placed teams from the 2002–03 League of Ireland First Division plus the ninth placed team from the Premier Division.

Semi-final
1st Legs

2nd Legs

Galway United win 2–1 on aggregate

Drogheda United win 4–2 on aggregate

Final

Drogheda United win 3–2 on aggregate and retain their place in the Premier Division.

See also
 2002–03 Shelbourne F.C. season
 2002–03 League of Ireland First Division

References

  
Ireland
1
League of Ireland Premier Division seasons